Song Wan may refer to:

Song Wan (Water Margin), Water Margin character
Song Wan (poet), early Qing poet